Borovinka is a rural locality (a village) in Pezhemskoye Rural Settlement of Velsky District, Arkhangelsk Oblast, Russia. The population was 48 as of 2014. There are 3 streets.

Geography 
Borovinka is located 23 km southwest of Velsk (the district's administrative centre) by road. Pezhma is the nearest rural locality.

References 

Rural localities in Velsky District